Viola biflora is a species of the genus Viola. It is also called alpine yellow-violet, arctic yellow violet, or twoflower violet.  It is found in Europe, Siberia, Central Asia, Pakistan, western and northern China, North Korea, Japan, and Western North America.

References

External links

biflora
Plants described in 1753
Taxa named by Carl Linnaeus
Flora of the Carpathians